Lavandula latifolia, known as broadleaved lavender, spike lavender, aspic lavender or Portuguese lavender,  is a flowering plant in the family Lamiaceae, native to the western Mediterranean region, from central Portugal to northern Italy (Liguria) through Spain and southern France. Hybridization can occur in the wild with English lavender (Lavandula  angustifolia).

The scent of Lavandula latifolia is stronger, with more camphor, and more pungent than Lavandula angustifolia scent. For this reason the two varieties are grown in separate fields.

Description
Lavandula latifolia is a strongly aromatic shrub growing to 30–80 cm tall. The leaves are evergreen, 3–6 cm long and 5–8 mm broad.

The flowers are pale lilac, produced on spikes 2–5 cm long at the top of slender, leafless stems 20–50 cm long. Flowers from June to September, depending on weather.

The fruit is a nut, indehiscent, monosperm of hardened pericarp. It consists of 4 small nuts which often remain locked inside the calyx tube. Grows from 0 to 1,700 m amsl.

Etymology
The species name latifolia is Latin for "broadleaf". The genus name Lavandula simply means lavender.

Chemical composition 
 Camphor (10.8–23.2%) 
 Eucalyptol (28.0–34.9%) 
 Borneol (0.9–3.6%) 
 α-Pinene(? %)  
 β-Pinene(0.8–2.6%)
 Caryophyllene (0.5–1.9%) 
 Camphene(0.4–0.6%) 
 Guaiazulene (? %)
 Linalool (27.2–43.1%) 
 Geraniol (? %)
 Limonene (0.2–0.9%)

Uses 
Lavandula latifolia can be used in aromatherapy.

References

Bibliography 
 Blumenthal M, Goldberg A, Brinckmann J. Herbal Medicine, Expanded Commission E Monographs. Integrative Medicine Communications, Newton. First Edition, 2000.
 Grases F, Melero G, Costa-Bauza A et al. Urolithiasis and phytotherapy. Int Urol Nephrol 1994; 26(5): 507–11.
 Paris RR, Moyse H. Matière Médicale. Masson & Cia., Paris; 1971. Tome .
 PDR for Herbal Medicines. Medical Economics Company, Montvale. Second Edition, 2000.

External links 

latifolia
Lavandula latifolia
Lavandula latifolia
Lavandula latifolia
Lavandula latifolia
Lavandula latifolia
Lavandula latifolia
Medicinal plants
Flora of the Mediterranean Basin
Plants described in 1784